Brenna George is a Canadian artist known for her painting and video art.

Her work is included in the collections of the National Gallery of Canada and the Surrey Art Gallery.

References

21st-century Canadian women artists
Living people
21st-century Canadian artists
Date of birth missing (living people)
Year of birth missing (living people)